XForms is a GUI toolkit based on Xlib for the X Window System. It features a rich set of objects, such as buttons, scrollbars, and menus etc. In addition, the library is extensible and new objects can easily be created and added to the library. It also includes the fdesign tool as a graphical user interface builder.

Distributed under the GNU Lesser General Public License, XForms is a free software.

XForms was based on the Forms Library by Mark Overmars, converted from IRIS GL (a precursor to OpenGL that also included calls to create windows and manage events) to X11. A similar conversion was used to make the first versions of FLTK, so all these toolkits are distantly related.

The toolkit was originally used by the Xfce desktop environment before the switch to the GTK+ toolkit.

References

External links

Project Page

Application programming interfaces
Free computer libraries